Santa Maria (Portuguese for Saint Mary) is a city in the southern part of the island municipality of Sal, Cape Verde. It is located on the south coast, about 16 km south of the Amílcar Cabral International Airport, and 20 km south of the island capital Espargos.

History
Santa Maria was founded in 1830 for the production of salt. Up to 30,000 tons of salt were shipped from Santa Maria each year. A pier was built in the area of Ponta de Vera Cruz and a small rail track was built to carry the salt to the pier. Most of the product was exported to Brazil, which was halted in 1887 when Brazil imposed a high tax on imported salt to protect its own salt production. The town went into a deep decline, only to recover in 1920 when a Portuguese investor resumed salt production. This continued until 1984. In 1935, Santa Maria was elevated from a village to a town. 

In 1967, Belgian industrialists and engineers Georges Vynckier and Marguerite Massart opened Cape Verde's first resort hotel named Morabeza. After 1986, tourism became an important industry on the island, and many resorts and hotels were built in the southern and southwestern coastal areas near Santa Maria. In 2017, 48.2% of the country's available beds were on the island of Sal.

Historical population

Points of interest
Praça Marcelo Leitão, the city's main square
Praia de Santa Maria, beach
Ponta de Vera Cruz, lighthouse
Santa Maria Saltpans, a protected landscape

Climate 
Santa Maria has an arid climate.  The highest mean temperature is in September with 27°C and its lowest is in January with 22°C.  Annual rainfall is very minimal at 76 mm, the wettest is 33 mm in September and the driest are 0 mm from the months of March to June. Its total average of rainy days is only three.  Water temperature ranges from 23 in winter months to 26 in summer and fall months. Humidity ranges from 70% in January, 75% during the summer months and in October to 77% in September.

Notable people
 Miguel Dias, boxer, immigrated to the Netherlands and played for the Dutch team
 Rodirlei José Ascensão Duarte (better known as Rody), footballer
 Manuel Antonio Martins, founder of Santa Maria, colonial governor
 Ruben Sança, athlete

See also
 List of cities in Cape Verde
 Tourism in Cape Verde

References

External links 

 
Cities in Cape Verde
Populated coastal places in Cape Verde
Geography of Sal, Cape Verde